Flaviramulus aestuariivivens is a Gram-negative, aerobic bacterium from the genus of Flaviramulus which has been isolated from tidal flat from Oido in Korea.

References

Sphingobacteriia
Bacteria described in 2017